Headrush is a 2003 Irish crime comedy, written and directed by Shimmy Marcus about two young guys, Charlie and T-Bag, who hope to solve all their problems by working for a notorious underworld criminal, The Uncle.

Plot
Down on his luck Charlie has been kicked off the dole, had his electricity cut off, and been dumped by his girlfriend Vicky. Despite claiming to be an expert on women, his best friend T-Bag has never had a girlfriend and the boys are convinced only money will change their depressing situation. The boys hear through their dealer Blowback that The Uncle is looking for new drug mules, so Charlie conceives an elaborate scam to smuggle a consignment of Cocaine back from Amsterdam. They meet The Uncle's nephew Razor Rupert and convince him that they're up for the job. As they lay their plans, each one egging the other on, each one refusing to admit to any fear, a series of comic coincidences begin to unravel their carefully laid plans.

Headrush is a story about frustration, fear, and friendship. Charlie is a lost soul in a society riddled with corruption, political distrust and a preoccupation with making money. Trying to cope with problems he brings on himself, he seems on an inevitable slide that takes him deeper and deeper into a world with fatal consequences.

Cast
 Wuzza Conlon as Charlie
 Gavin Kelty as T-Bag
 B.P. Fallon as Blowback
 Huey Morgan as The Yank
 Karl Argue as Flem
 Steven Berkoff as The Uncle
 Amanda Brunker
 Donncha Crowley as Detective Insp. Dunne
 Moira Deady as Mrs. Macroom
 Mark Doherty as Detective Walsh
 Dermot Doran as Bambi
 Tom Hickey as Malcom Nobel
 Pat Kinevane as Razor Rupert
 Winston Nairne as Milk
 Mick Nolan as Detective O'Donoghue
 Gerry O'Brien as Mr. Doublehorn
 Gavin O'Connor as Neville
 Jer O'Leary as Tramp Snitch
 Sarah Pilkington as Jacinta
 Laura Pyper as Vicky
 Rachel Rath as Junkie
 Viviana Verveen as Biker
 Aonghus Weber as Knob

Reception

Critical response
The movie has been criticised for its unoriginality and similarities to other movies.

Awards
 Winner - Best Feature - Braunschweig Film Festival (2005)
 Winner - Best Unreleased Feature - East Lansing Film Festival (2005)
 Nominated - Best Feature Film - IFTA (2005)
 Winner - Best Feature - NY Film Fleadh (2004)
 Winner - Best Soundtrack - Foyle Film Festival (2003)
 2nd Place - Best Feature - Galway Film Fleadh (2003)
 Winner - Miramx Scriptwriting Award (1999)

References

External links
 Zanzibar Films
 
 
 Variety review

Irish crime comedy films
2003 films
2000s crime comedy films
English-language Irish films
2003 comedy films
2000s English-language films